Fromo or Phromo Kesaro (Bactrian script: , phonetical transcription of "Rome Caesar") was a king of the Turk Shahis (also known as the Kabul Shahis), a dynasty of Western Turk or mixed Western Turk-Hephthalite origin, who ruled from Kabul and Kapisa to Gandhara in the 7th to 9th centuries. In Chinese sources "Fromo Kesaro" was transcribed "拂菻罽娑" (pinyin: Fulin Jisuo; jyutping: fat1lam4 gai3so1), "Fulin" (拂菻) being the standard Tang dynasty name for "Byzantine Empire".

Origin of the name "Rome Ceasar"
From 719 CE, Tegin Shah was the king of the Turk Shahis. He then abdicated in 739 CE in favour of his son Fromo Kesaro. The name "Fromo Kesaro" was the probable phonetic transcription of "Rome Ceasar" in honor of "Caesar", the title of the then East Roman Emperor Leo III the Isaurian who had defeated their common enemy the Arabs in 717 CE. Leo III the Isaurian then sent an embassy through Central Asia in 719 CE, which travelled as far as China. The Chinese annals record that "In the first month of the seventh year of the period Kaiyuan [719 CE] their Lord [拂菻王, "the King of Fulin"] sent the Ta-shou-ling [an officer of high rank] of T'u-huo-lo [吐火羅, Tokhara] (...) to offer lions and ling-yang [antelopes], two of each. A few months after, he further sent Ta-te-seng ["priests of great virtue"] to our court with tribute."

Investiture of Fromo Kesaro in 738/739 CE
The Turk Shahis were nominally vassals of the Chinese Tang dynasty court, and they regularly sent embassies for official matters. In 738 CE, Tegin Shah sent a request in order to abdicate in favour of his son Fromo Kesaro. These events are recorded in the Chinese annals Cefu Yuangui.

Conflict with the Arabs
Kabulistan was the heartland of the Turk Shahi domain, which at times included Zabulistan and Gandhara. Some of their coins were minted in eastern Gandhara, in the Turk Shahis winter capital of Hund (Udabhandapura). During their rule, the Turk Shahi were in constant conflict against the eastward expansion of the Abbasid Caliphate. Circa 650 CE, the Arabs attacked Shahi territory from the west, and captured Kabul. But the Turk Shahi were able to mount a counter-offensive and repulsed the Arabs, taking back the areas of Kabul and Zabulistan (around Ghazni), as well as the region of Arachosia as far as Kandahar. The Arabs again failed to capture Kabul and Zabulistan in 697-698 CE, and their general Yazid ibn Ziyad was killed in the action.

Fromo Kesaro appears to have fought vigorously against the Arabs. The Arabs are known to have been forced to pay tribute to Fromo Kesaro, since Sasanian coins and coins of Arab governors were overstruck on the rim with the following text in the Bactrian script describing his victory over the Arabs:

The victories of Fromo Kesaro against the Arabs may have forged the Tibetan epic legend of King Phrom Ge-sar.

Succession

In 745 CE, Fromo Kesaro sent a request to the Chinese court in order to abdicate in favour of his son Bo Fuzun (勃匐準, his name is only known from Chinese sources). These events are again recorded in the Chinese annals Jiu Tangshu and Tang Huiyao.
  

The Turk Shahis eventually weakened against the Arabs in the late 9th century CE. Kandahar, Kabul and Zabul were lost to the Arabs, while in Gandhara the Hindu Shahi took over. The last Shahi ruler of Kabul, Lagaturman, was deposed by a Brahmin minister, possibly named Vakkadeva, in c. 850, signaling the end of the Buddhist Turk Shahi dynasty, and the beginning of the Hindu Shahi dynasty of Kabul.

Notes

References

Sources

Turkic dynasties
Dynasties of Afghanistan
Kabul Shahi